The 2016–17 Scottish Lowland Football League (known as the Ferrari Packaging Lowland League for sponsorship reasons) was the fourth season of the Lowland Football League, the fifth tier of the Scottish football pyramid system. Edinburgh City were the defending champions but could not defend their title after being promoted to Scottish League Two.

East Stirlingshire became the first club to join the league via relegation from the SPFL, having lost the League Two play-off against Edinburgh City. Threave Rovers declined the opportunity to re-apply for membership following their bottom place finish the previous season and instead rejoined the South of Scotland Football League.  Hawick Royal Albert and Civil Service Strollers joined the league from the East of Scotland Football League to bring the number of clubs to 16 for the first time.

The league was won with two matches still to play by East Kilbride on 1 April 2017 after they defeated Gala Fairydean Rovers 6–1. East Kilbride defeated the winners of the 2016–17 Highland Football League (Buckie Thistle) in the League Two play-offs semi-finals, but lost to Cowdenbeath on penalties in the final.

Teams

The following teams have changed division since the 2015–16 season.

To Lowland League
Transferred from East of Scotland League
 Civil Service Strollers
 Hawick Royal Albert

Relegated from League Two
East Stirlingshire

From Lowland League
Promoted to League Two
Edinburgh City

Relegated to South of Scotland League
 Threave Rovers

League table

Results

Lowland League play-off
A play-off was due to take place between the winners of the 2016–17 East of Scotland Football League (Lothian Thistle Hutchison Vale) and the 2016–17 South of Scotland Football League (Edusport Academy). However Lothian Thistle Hutchison Vale did not meet the required licensing criteria therefore Edusport Academy were promoted automatically to replace Preston Athletic.

References

Lowland Football League seasons
5
Scottish